is a spin-off of the Ultra Series. Produced by Tsuburaya Productions, Ultraman Nice was released in a series of commercials on October 20, 1999, with a total of 20 episodes.

Plot
Ultraman Nice arrives from the planet TOY-1 in a series of infomercials (1-minute toy commercials) presented during the 1999 Japanese reruns of Ultraman Tiga. The 1-minute spots, advertising the wide variety of Bandai Ultraman toys, actually do have a storyline, along with some surprise guests.

Throughout the series, Alien Zagon and his monsters attacked Earth for the Bandai figures. However, at each attack, Ultraman Nice managed to defeat them and, at the end of the series, the aliens were finally vanquished.

Characters

GOKAZOKU Officers
The  is an attack team consist of the six members of Yumeboshi family. Each family members piloted their own  in against Alien Zagon and his monsters.

: The patriarch of the Yumeboshi family through mukoyōshi, aged 35 years old and worked as a teacher in nursery school. His double life is a secret to everyone except the elders of Yumeboshi family.
Ultraman Nice's true age is 10,390 years old. He is distinctively known for a large "N" letter on his back and the Color Timer situated on his left chest. All of his statistics revolves around the number 39, which is a nod to the goroawase for "thank you", spoken in Japanese transliteration.
 and : Akimi's parents and the Yumeboshi family's elders, aged 60 and 54 years old respectively.
: Ginga's 33 years old wife and the matriarch of Yumeboshi family.
 and : The children of the Yumeboshi family, aged 10 and 7 respectively. Cosmo is the older sister of the pair, while Mirai is the younger brother who's a fan of Ultra Series.

Zagon Galaxy creatures
They are led by Alien Zagon and usually fights against the GOKAZOKU members and Ultraman Nice. Their aliases are written in Hiragana in the 2001 magazine.

: A heinous alien from third planet Zagon Star bent on conquering Earth and frequently fights Ultraman Nice. As his alias suggest, Zagon has the ability to secrete poison gas from his ears but was never shown in the series proper.
: A pinkish traffic sign/traffic light themed monster from the eighth Planet  with the ability to unleash sound waves.
: A spiral-themed monster from the twelfth Planet . It is capable of spitting fireballs.
: A porcine monster from the fifth planet . It has giant ears capable of assuming as Tabu-Zagon's alternate face with reflective properties but its weak point is its snout. Tabu-Zagon is a late addition to the other monsters, as it appeared during the winter 2000 arc of the infomercial, hence he was absent from a tag team between the Zagon Galaxy creatures.

Design
Ultraman Nice and the Zagon Galaxy creatures are all designed by Hiroshi Maruyama. Nice's mask used the same mold as Ultraman Tiga, but his crest is colored red and has a pair of blue-colored side lines. Alien Zagon on the other hand was based on a monster in Ultraman Tiga while adding more colors to the image.

Cast
Ginga Yumeboshi: 
Kataru Yumeboshi: 
Kiku Yumeboshi: 
Akimi Yumeboshi: 
Cosmo Yumeboshi: 
Mirai Yumeboshi: 
Narrator: 
Alien Zagon (voice): 
Ultraman Nice (suit actor): 
Monster suit actor:

Episodes
You're Not Calling!!
The Secret of Ultraman Nice...
From the Mouth Comes Evil...
I Want an Airplane...
I Made a Mistake!
Discharge the Very Nice Ray!!
Ultraman Nice is Also Cool!
Spring Outfits are Here!!
Let's Go to the Picnic!!
Be Careful Not to Get Too Hooked...
He's Here!! Tabu Zagon
Mirai, Lost
Having Overslept...
In Exchange for That...
Don't Get in my Way!!
Captured Mirai
New Monster is Here
Mirai's Dream Come True
Papa, Exhausted
Nice is the Best!!

Theme song
"Ultraman Nice"
Lyric: 
Composer: 
Arrangement: MANTA
Singer: Project DMM

References

 
 
 
 
 

Ultra television series
1990s Japanese television series
2000s Japanese television series
1999 Japanese television series debuts
2000 Japanese television series endings